SH3 and cysteine-rich domain-containing protein 3 is a protein that in humans is encoded by the STAC3 gene.

STAC3 has been shown to be associated with the a special form of myopathy known as Native American myopathy (NAM), a neuromuscular disorder characterized by weakness, arthrogryposis, kyphoscoliosis, short stature, cleft palate, ptosis and susceptibility to malignant hyperthermia during anesthesia. It was first identified through a genetic screen in zebrafish and was shown to be a component of the excitation contraction coupling machinery, followed by it being mapped to the region of the human genome which had been shown to be associated with the defects observed in NAM.

References

Human proteins